This is a list of women writers who were born in Poland or whose writings are closely associated with that country.

A
Miriam Akavia (1927–2015), Polish-born Israeli novelist, translator
Lisa Appignanesi (born 1946), Polish-born English-language novelist, non-fiction writer, editor, columnist
Franciszka Arnsztajnowa (1865–1942), poet, playwright, journalist

B
Rosa Bailly (1890–1976), teacher, activist, translator, journalist history and travel writer and poet
Lidia Bajkowska, writer of children’s educational music books 
Jadwiga Barańska (born 1935), actress, screenwriter
Ewa Białołęcka (born 1967), novelist, short story writer
Agnieszka Biedrzycka, contemporary historian, researcher and editor of the Polish Biographical Dictionary
Irena Bobowska (1920–1942), journalist, editor, poet, resistance worker
Helena Boguszewska (1883–1978), writer, columnist and social activist
Barbara Bojarska, contemporary historian, works on the history of Pomerania
Maria Boniecka (1910–1978), editor, writer, teacher, resistance fighter
Anna Brzezińska, (born 1971), historian, fantasy author

C
Zofia Chądzyńska (1912–2003), novelist, translator
Joanna Chmielewska (1932–2013), widely translated bestselling crime fiction novelist, short story writer, non-fiction writer, screenwriter
Sylwia Chutnik (born 1979), novelist
Izabela Czartoryska (1746–1835), salonist, diarist, memoirist

D
Maria Dąbrowska (1889–1965), novelist, essayist, journalist, playwright
Janina Domanska (1913–1995), Polish-American children's writer, writing in English
Gusta Dawidson Draenger (1917–1943), diarist
Kinga Dunin (born 1954), novelist, non-fiction writer, feminist
Elżbieta Drużbacka (c.1695–1765), poet 
Wanda Dynowska (1888–1971), theosophist, non-fiction writer, publisher in India, translator of Polish poetry into English

F
Ida Fink (1921–2011), Polish-Israeli writer, Polish-language works on the Holocaust
Wirydianna Fiszerowa (1761–1826), noblewoman, French-language memoirist

G
Zuzanna Ginczanka (1917–1945), poet, translator
Agnieszka Graff (born 1970), non-fiction writer, essayist, columnist, feminist
Manuela Gretkowska (born 1964), novelist, short story writer, screenwriter, politician
Katarzyna Grochola (born 1957), best selling novelist, short story writer, playwright
Wioletta Grzegorzewska (born 1974), poet, some works translated into English

H
Klementyna Hoffmanowa (1798–1845), children's author, translator

I
Maria Ilnicka (c.1825–1897), poet, novelist, translator, journalist
Bozenna Intrator (born 1964), Polish-American novelist, poet, playwright, translator, writing in German, Polish and English

J
Irena Jurgielewiczowa (1903–2003), children's writer, memoirist

K
Anna Kamieńska (1920–1986), children's writer, poet, translator
Anna Kańtoch (born 1976), fantasy writer
Gerda Weissmann Klein (born 1924), Polish-American writer, works on the Holocaust
Irena Klepfisz (born 1941), poet, essayist, feminist writer, translator, writing in Yiddish and English
Maria Konopnicka (1842–1910), acclaimed poet, novelist, children's writer
Rachel Korn (1898–1982), poet, writing in Polish and (mainly) Yiddish
Zofia Kossak-Szczucka (1889–1968), historical novelist, memoirist, columnist
Chana Kowalska (1899–1942), Jewish painter and journalist
Faustina Kowalska (1905–1938), nun, author of a diary relating her mystic experiences
Hanna Krall (born 1935), journalist, historian, works on the war period in Poland
Katarzyna Krenz (born 1953), poet, novelist, translator
Maria Kuncewiczowa (1895–1989), novelist, columnist

L
Anna Langfus (1920–1966), Polish-born French-language novelist
Marija Lastauskienė (1872–1957), novelist, short story writer, often in collaboration with her sister Sofija Pšibiliauskienė, wrote in Polish and Lithuanian
Henryka Łazowertówna (1909–1942), poet, remembered for her poem written in the Warsaw Ghetto
Joanna Lech (born 1984), poet, some works translated into English 
Ewa Lipska (born 1945), widely translated poet
Tekla Teresa Łubieńska (1767–1810), poet, playwright and translator from the French and English
Jadwiga Łuszczewska (1834–1908), poet, novelist

M
Wanda Malecka (1800–1860), editor, translator, poet, novelist, newspaper publisher, journalist
Dorota Masłowska (born 1983), best selling novelist, playwright
Grażyna Miller (1957–2009), poet, critic, translator
Weronika Murek (born 1989) short story writer, playwright
Małgorzata Musierowicz (born 1945), popular children's writer

N
Anna Nakwaska (1781–1851), memoirist, novelist, children's author and women's educationalist
Zofia Nałkowska (1884–1954), acclaimed novelist, playwright
The Black Pearl (Madlen Namro)

O
Eliza Orzeszkowa (1841–1910), acclaimed novelist, playwright, short story writer
Hanna Ożogowska (1904–1995), novelist, poet, translator

P
Helena Janina Pajzderska (1862–1927), novelist, poet, translator
Magdalena Parys (born 1971), novelist
Maria Pawlikowska-Jasnorzewska (1891–1945), acclaimed poet, playwright
Tillie S. Pine (1896–1999), Polish-American children's writer
Halina Poświatowska (1935–1967), significant poet, essayist, autobiographer
Stanisława Przybyszewska (1901–1935), playwright, writer of acclaimed works on the French revolution
Sofija Pšibiliauskienė (1867–1926), sister of Marija Lastauskienė, co-authored some of her works

R
Małgorzata Rejmer (born 1985) novelist, short story writer
Maria Rodziewiczówna (1863–1944), important novelist and short story writer of the interwar period
Chava Rosenfarb (1923–2011), Polish born Yiddish poet, short story writer

S
Barbara Sanguszko (1718–1791), poet, translator, moralist and philanthropist
Magdalena Samozwaniec (1894–1972), satirist
Wanda Sieradzka de Ruig (1923–2008), poet, journalist, television screenwriter
Kate Simon (1912–1990), Polish-born American travel writer, autobiographer
Żanna Słoniowska (born 1978), novelist
Dominika Słowik (born 1988) writer
Eva Stachniak (born 1952), Polish-born Canadian novelist, short story writer
Anna Świrszczyńska (1909–1984), poet, some works translated into English
Anna Szatkowska (1928–2015), memoirist, wartime experiences written in French
Lola Szereszewska (1895–1943), Polish-Jewish poet journalist
Małgorzata Szumowska (born 1973), screenwriter, film director
Wisława Szymborska (1923–2012), poet, essayist, translation, Nobel Prize in Literature

T
Olga Tokarczuk (born 1962), poet, popular novelist, short story writer, essayist, Nobel Prize in Literature
Dorota Terakowska (1938–2004) novelist and journalist best known for literature for children and young adults
Magdalena Tulli (born 1955), novelist, translator

W
Bronisława Wajs (1908–1987), Polish-Romani poet, singer
Joanna Wajs (born 1979), poet, critic, translator
Maria Wirtemberska (1768–1854), salonist, novelist
Maia Wojciechowska (1927–2002), Polish-American children's writer

Z 
Julia Zabłocka (1931–1993), historian, archaeologist
Anna Zahorska (1882–1942), poet, novelist, playwright
Stefania Zahorska (1890–1961), novelist, historian, non-fiction writer, memoirist
Maria Julia Zaleska (1831–1889), novelist, short story writer, essayist
Gabriela Zapolska (1857–1921), prolific novelist, playwright, short story writer, critic, actress
Katarzyna Ewa Zdanowicz-Cyganiak (born 1979), acclaimed contemporary poet, regional journalist and social scientist
Narcyza Żmichowska (1819–1876), pen name Gabryella, novelist, poet, letter writer, feminist
Rajzel Żychlińsky (1910–2001), Yiddish-language poet

See also
List of Polish-language authors
List of women writers

References

-
Polish
Writers
Writers, Women